"Up the Junction" was the third single released from Squeeze's second album, Cool for Cats, sung by Glenn Tilbrook.  It is one of the band's most popular and well-remembered songs (especially in the UK), and reached number 2 on the UK Singles Chart, the same position as its predecessor, "Cool for Cats".

History
Up the Junction is also the name of a collection of short stories by Nell Dunn, first published in 1963. Lyricist Chris Difford said that the title phrase was lifted from the 1965 TV play version of the work, directed by Ken Loach, and the subsequent 1968 movie version. The film had a soundtrack by Manfred Mann, and a song by them, also called Up the Junction.

Although the song is not the about the TV drama, it alludes to its themes and location:

 Portrayal of life in Battersea (the song begins "I never thought it would happen with me and the girl from Clapham")
 "Junction" refers to Clapham Junction
 Colloquial working-class language
 The subject of pregnancy.

Chris Difford wrote the lyrics in New Orleans while Squeeze were on tour. Difford passed the lyrics to Glenn Tilbrook who then wrote the music. The song is known for its use of half-rhymes, such as "ready" and "telly" or "kitchen" and "missing". The title is not sung until the final line. Difford has been quoted as saying that he took the lead from Roxy Music's "Virginia Plain," in which the title also appeared only at the end. Glenn Tilbrook has said that the music was partly inspired by the Bob Dylan song "Positively 4th Street", and the lack of a chorus or lyrical repetitionunusual in a mainstream pop hitwas due to Tilbrook feeling that a repeated section would upset the flow of Difford's narrative lyrics.

The phrase 'Up the junction' is London slang for being in deep trouble, as in the American 'Up the creek without a paddle'. It is also, like other lines in the song, a reference to the (at the time) working-class area of Clapham Junction in Battersea in London. Clapham Commonthe "windy common" of the first verseis a popular courting spot.

The language of the song uses a terse, acerbic 'working-class' humour such as in lines like …where she dealt out the rations
With some or other passions
I said, "You are a lady"
"Perhaps," she said, "I may be"

At first, it is an idyllic story of proletarian happiness: the couple's courtship swiftly moves into living together; they have a child; the man gets a job, saves money. But by the end of the song, he has fallen into alcoholism, she is with another man, his machismo is such that he cannot beg forgiveness, and "so it's [his] assumption, [he's] really up the junction"that is, both "up the junction" in the sense of living in the area of Clapham Junction, and in that of having comprehensively wrecked his own life.

The video showed the band playing inside a flatactually the kitchen of John Lennon's old house, where Lennon had made the promotional film for "Imagine." One of the two girls in the background was Michelle Collins. Also, similar to the "Cool for Cats" music video, even though Harri Kakoulli played bass in the recording, he had left the band, and John Bentley takes his place in the music video. Difford and Tilbrook explained their calmer performance in the video saying that they recorded the "Up the Junction" music video the same day as "Cool for Cats", and they were drunk and exhausted. The band made a tongue-in-cheek performance of Up the Junction on British chart show Top of the Pops in which band members play the 'wrong instrument', with singer Glenn Tilbrook drumming and Jools Holland (normally a pianist) making minimal attempts to look at all proficient at the guitar.

The song is briefly heard playing on a hairdresser's radio in the 1982 film Brimstone and Treacle and its soundtrack album. It also appears in the TV series Breaking Bad, in the season five episode Gliding Over All.

Difford's performance of the song live on Platform 10 at Clapham Junction railway station was featured on the BBC Radio 4 programme Lyrical Journey in September 2011.

The song's "girl from Clapham" made an appearance on the later song "A Moving Story", from the band's 1998 album Domino.

Track listing
 "Up the Junction" (3:10)
 "It's So Dirty" (3:10)

References

External links
Squeeze discography at Squeezenet

1979 singles
Songs about London
Songs about pregnancy
Songs written by Chris Difford
Songs written by Glenn Tilbrook
Squeeze (band) songs